The basketball tournament at the 2017 Jeux de la Francophonie in Abidjan, Ivory Coast took place between 22 July and 29 July. Only women's tournament was held in Palais des Sports de Treichville. France defeated Quebec in the gold medal match 73-53.

Competition schedule

Participating nations

Medalists

Group stage
Times are local UTC+0.

Group A

Group B

Group C

Group D

Placement Round

Final round

Quarterfinals

Semifinals

Bronze medal match

Gold medal match

Final standings

References

External links
 Livre des resultats
Official Website

2017
Jeux de la Francophonie
2017 Jeux de la Francophonie
2017 Jeux de la Francophonie